Vlado Tortevski (born 21 June 1959) is a Macedonian football manager and former player.

Club career
Born in Pechkovo, SR Macedonia, he played as a midfielder with number of Yugoslav clubs namely Tikvesh, Vardar, Timok and Teteks, mostly in the Yugoslav Second League, also playing with Vardar in the Yugoslav First League.

In 1989, he moved to Australia where, after playing one season with Footscray JUST in 1989 he became a manager, and has coached Preston Lions and Altona Magic during the 2000s.

References

1959 births
Living people
Association football midfielders
Yugoslav footballers
Macedonian footballers
FK Tikvesh players
FK Vardar players
FK Timok players
FK Teteks players
Footscray JUST players
Yugoslav First League players
Yugoslav expatriate footballers
Expatriate soccer players in Australia
Yugoslav expatriate sportspeople in Australia
Macedonian football managers
Preston Lions FC managers
Expatriate soccer managers in Australia
Macedonian expatriate sportspeople in Australia